Gary Emanuel (born October 30, 1958) is an American football coach who served as defensive line coach of the Atlanta Falcons. He was the defensive line coach of the Indianapolis Colts from 2012 to 2017 and the New York Giants from 2018 to 2019.

References

1958 births
Living people
Plymouth State Panthers football coaches
West Chester Golden Rams football coaches
UMass Minutemen football coaches
Dartmouth Big Green football coaches
Syracuse Orange football coaches
Washington State Cougars football coaches
Purdue Boilermakers football coaches
San Jose State Spartans football coaches
Rutgers Scarlet Knights football coaches
San Francisco 49ers coaches
Indianapolis Colts coaches
New York Giants coaches
Atlanta Falcons coaches